The Zlin Z-37 Čmelák (Czech: "Bumblebee"), also known as LET Z-37 Čmelák is an agricultural aircraft which was manufactured in Czechoslovakia. It is powered by a Soviet-built Ivchenko reciprocating engine. The aircraft is used mainly as a cropduster.

Design and development

Design work on a purpose-designed agricultural aircraft started in Czechoslovakia in 1961, with a cooperation of two manufacturers: Let Kunovice and Moravan (Zlin brand). The first prototype, designated as XZ-37, first flew on 29 March 1963 (other sources:29 June). It was a cantilever low-wing monoplane of tubular metal construction, the wings and stabilizers covered with duralumin and the fuselage and control surfaces made of fabric. It had a fixed undercarriage with a fully castering tailwheel, but locked to the rudders for ground handling. The pilot's cockpit was in front, immediately behind a 315 hp radial engine, with a hopper for chemicals situated behind the cockpit. This offered the pilot a good view, but was potentially dangerous in case of an emergency landing. A mechanic could be seated behind the hopper, facing backwards. There were also spray booms mounted under the wings. There is also a freight version with open space instead of hopper and spray equipment and a -3 variant with three passenger seats facing rearwards.

The aircraft was produced from 1965 under the designation Z-37. From 1971, the Z-37A was produced, with a strengthened construction. It was produced until 1975, and then in 1983-1984. A total of 677 were produced, including 27 two-seater Z-37A-2s for crew training.

On 6 September 1981 the prototype XZ-37T first flew, powered by a (691 shp) Walter M-601B turboprop engine. Two further prototypes of the definitive turboprop version, the Z-37T Agro Turbo,  powered by a less powerful M-601Z engine, flew on 12 July and 29 December 1983. As well as the new engine, it had longer-span wings (13.63 m) fitted with winglets.

The Z-37T was produced from 1985 until 1994, with a total of 51 aircraft built., including some Z-37T-2 two-seater trainers. Later production aircraft were redesignated Zlin Z-137T.

Operational history
The main user of Z-37s was Czechoslovakia (now the Czech Republic and Slovakia) along with East Germany and other Eastern Bloc countries.  Many were exported to the Sudan and India and flown there almost non-stop with the hopper used as extra fuel tank. Variants are as far afield as England and the USA. Current use is limited because of fuel costs and is now used mainly in Slovakia. Many are used for glider towing, having the ability to easily tow two gliders and often transport four gliders in tow for cross country.

A record has been set by a Z 137T in Slovakia, towing nine two-seat gliders.

Variants

XZ-37
First prototype.

Z-37
First production version built between 1965 and 1971.

Z-37A
Second production version with strengthened construction. Built between 1971 and 1975 and later between 1983 and 1984, 650 built.

Z-37A-2
Two-seat version for crew training, 27 built.

Z-37A-3
Pilot plus three passenger version.  Conversion of "A" version. Rear-facing seats.

XZ-37T
Prototype of the turboprop version powered by Walter M-601B engine, built in 1981.

Z-37T Agro Turbo
Turboprop version with bigger span wings, powered by Walter M-601Z engine and built between 1985 and 1987. 28 built including Z-37T-2 trainer.

Z-37T-2
Two-seat turboprop version for crew training built between 1985 and 1987.

Z-137T
Further development version.

Operators
The Zlín Z-37  has been used extensively in former Eastern Bloc countries, including its country of manufacture Czechoslovakia (Slov-Air being a major operator), Bulgaria, East Germany and Hungary. It also saw service in Finland, India, Iraq and Yugoslavia.

Aircraft on display
Bulgaria
 Zlin Z-37 on display at the Aviation Museum in Plovdiv.
Czech Republic
 Let Z-37 Čmelák on display at the Letecké Muzeum Kunovice in Kunovice.
Serbia
 819 – Let Z-37A on display at the Museum of Aviation in Belgrade.
New Zealand
 851004 – Let Z-37T on display at the Ashburton Aviation Museum in Ashburton, Canterbury.

Specifications (Z-37A (agricultural version))

See also

References

External links

Photos of Čmelák in action
Photos at Airliners.net
Photo and description (in Slovak)

1960s Czechoslovakian agricultural aircraft
Zlín aircraft
Glider tugs
Single-engined tractor aircraft
Low-wing aircraft
Aircraft first flown in 1963